This is a list of Kokborok Cinema produced in the Kokborok language.

Notable feature films: 1980s

Notable feature films: 1990s

Notable feature films: 20004-2009

Notable feature films: 2010-2018

Notable non-feature films: 2017-present

References 

Lists of films by language
Indian film-related lists
Films
Cinema of Tripura
Films shot in Tripura